Nebria baicalica is a species of ground beetle in the Nebriinae subfamily that is endemic to Irkutsk area, Russia, more precisely, Buryat Republic. The species live around gravel banks of Lake Baikal and its shores.

References

baicalica
Beetles described in 1844
Endemic fauna of Buryatia